Ahmet Demircan (born 13 July 1954) is a Turkish physician and politician. He served as the Minister of Health between 2017 and 2018.

Demircan is a graduate from Atatürk University's Faculty of Medicine. He specialized in General Surgery at the same faculty. He worked as practitioner at the state hospitals of Samsun, Muş and Bafra. He was a deputy for Samsun in the 20th, 21st, 25th, 26th and 27th Parliamentary period. He was a Ministry of State in the 54th government of Turkey.

Demircan served as deputy chairmen of the People's Voice Party. He was appointed to the Ministry of Health due to the changes made in the cabinet on 19 July 2017.

References 

Living people
1954 births
21st-century Turkish politicians
Welfare Party politicians
Felicity Party politicians
Justice and Development Party (Turkey) politicians
Atatürk University alumni
Ministers of State of Turkey
Health ministers of Turkey
People from Samsun
Turkish Islamists